Eunidia wittei is a species of beetle in the family Cerambycidae. It was described by Stephan von Breuning in 1940. It is known from the Democratic Republic of the Congo.

References

Eunidiini
Beetles described in 1940
Endemic fauna of the Democratic Republic of the Congo